In mathematics, the moving sofa problem or sofa problem is a two-dimensional idealisation of real-life furniture-moving problems and asks for the rigid two-dimensional shape of largest area that can be maneuvered through an L-shaped planar region with legs of unit width. The area thus obtained is referred to as the sofa constant. The exact value of the sofa constant is an open problem. The currently leading solution, by Joseph L. Gerver, has a value of approximately 2.2195 and is thought to be close to the optimal, based upon subsequent study and theoretical bounds.

History
The first formal publication was by the Austrian-Canadian mathematician Leo Moser in 1966, although there had been many informal mentions before that date.

Bounds
Work has been done on proving that the sofa constant (A) cannot be below or above certain values (lower bounds and upper bounds).

Lower

This comes from a sofa that is a half-disk of unit radius, which can rotate in the corner.

John Hammersley derived a lower bound of  based on a shape resembling a telephone handset, consisting of two quarter-disks of radius 1 on either side of a 1 by  rectangle from which a half-disk of radius  has been removed.

In 1992, Joseph L. Gerver of Rutgers University described a sofa described by 18 curve sections each taking a smooth analytic form. This further increased the lower bound for the sofa constant to approximately 2.2195.

Upper
Hammersley also found an upper bound on the sofa constant, showing that it is at most .

Ambidextrous sofa 

A variant of the sofa problem asks the shape of largest area that can go round both left and right 90 degree corners in a corridor of unit width (where the left and right corners are spaced sufficiently far apart that one is fully negotiated before the other is encountered). A lower bound of area approximately 1.64495521 has been described by Dan Romik. His sofa is also described by 18 curve sections.

See also
Dirk Gently's Holistic Detective Agency – novel by Douglas Adams, a subplot of which revolves around such a problem.
Mountain climbing problem
Moser's worm problem
Square packing in a square
"The One with the Cop" - an episode of the American TV series Friends with a subplot revolving around such a problem.

References

External links

SofaBounds - Program to calculate bounds on the sofa moving problem.
A 3D model of Romik's ambidextrous sofa

Discrete geometry
Unsolved problems in geometry
Recreational mathematics
1966 introductions